Rožnov is a municipality and village in Náchod District in the Hradec Králové Region of the Czech Republic. It has about 400 inhabitants.

Administrative parts
The village of Neznášov is an administrative part of Rožnov.

History
The first written mention of Rožnov is from 1387. Neznášov was first mentioned in 1371.

References

External links

Villages in Náchod District